"Dumb" is a song by British R&B group the 411. It was written by band members Suzie Furlonger, Carolyn Owlett, Tisha Martin and Tanya Boniface along with Gandalf Roudette-Mushcamp and Joshua Thompson for their debut studio album Between the Sheets (2004). Production was helmed by Dave McCracken, based on an original production by Redeye, with Fitzgerald Scott credited as additional and vocal producer on the track.

The song was released as the album's second single on 23 August 2004. "Dumb" is the 411's highest-charting single, entering and peaking at number three on the UK Singles Chart. In other countries, "Dumb" peaked at number 12 in Ireland as well as the top 40 in Australia, Austria, Germany, and Switzerland. In Germany, the song served as the theme song for Sex and the City during ProSieben's commercial breaks. A French language version of the song called "Face á toi baby" with French rapper Mag (featuring the verses from "Dumb" with a special French chorus) appears on the French version of Between the Sheets.

In 2018, singer Imani Williams sampled "Dumb" for her single of the same name.

Music video
The music video features the band performing in strobing lights. In the first half, they wear black outfits, before changing to colourful costumes in the second half. Furlonger wore a wig during the shoot.

Track listings
All tracks were written by the 411, Gandalf Roudette-Mushcamp, and Joshua Thompson.

Notes
  denotes original producer
  denotes vocal and additional producer
  denotes remix producer

Personnel
Personnel are adapted from the liner notes of Between the Sheets.

 Tanya Boniface – vocals, writing
 Steve Fitzmaurice – mix engineering
 Suzie Furlonger – vocals, writing
 Tisha Martin – vocals, writing
 Dave McCracken – producer
 Carolyn Owlett – vocals, writing
 Gandalf Roudette-Mushcamp – vocals, writing
 Fitzgerald Scott – additional production, vocal production
 Joshua Thompson – vocals, writing

Charts

Weekly charts

Year-end charts

Release history

References

2004 singles
2004 songs
The 411 songs
Sony Music UK singles